Gurgurnica is a village in the municipality of Brvenica, North Macedonia.

Demographics
As of the 2021 census, Gurgurnica had 954 residents with the following ethnic composition:
Albanians 863
Persons for whom data are taken from administrative sources 90
Macedonians 1

According to the 2002 census, the village had a total of 1556 inhabitants. Ethnic groups in the village include:

Albanians 1549
Macedonians 1
Others 6

References

External links

Villages in Brvenica Municipality
Albanian communities in North Macedonia